This article lists important figures and events in Malayan public affairs during the year 1960, together with births and deaths of significant Malayans.

Incumbent political figures

Federal level
Yang di-Pertuan Agong: 
Tuanku Abdul Rahman of Negeri Sembilan (until 4 April)
Sultan Hisamuddin Alam Shah of Selangor (from 14 April until 1 September)
Tuanku Syed Putra of Perlis (from 21 September)
Raja Permaisuri Agong: 
Tuanku Kurshiah of Negeri Sembilan (until 4 April)
Tengku Ampuan Jemaah of Selangor (from 14 April until 1 September)
Tengku Budriah of Perlis (from 21 September)
Prime Minister: Tunku Abdul Rahman
Deputy Prime Minister: Datuk Abdul Razak

State level
 Sultan of Johor: Sultan Ismail
 Sultan of Kedah: Sultan Abdul Halim Muadzam Shah
 Sultan of Kelantan: 
Sultan Ibrahim (until November)
Sultan Yahya Petra (from November)
 Raja of Perlis: Tuanku Syed Sirajuddin (Regent from 21 September)
 Sultan of Perak: Sultan Yusuf Izzuddin Shah
 Sultan of Pahang: Sultan Abu Bakar
 Sultan of Selangor: 
Tengku Abdul Aziz Shah (Regent from 14 April until 1 September)
Sultan Salahuddin Abdul Aziz Shah (from 1 September)
 Sultan of Terengganu: Sultan Ismail Nasiruddin Shah (Deputy Yang di-Pertuan Agong)
 Yang di-Pertuan Besar of Negeri Sembilan: Tuanku Munawir (Regent until 4 April)
 Yang di-Pertua Negeri (Governor) of Penang: Raja Tun Uda
 Yang di-Pertua Negeri (Governor) of Malacca: Tun Leong Yew Koh

(Source: Malaysian Department of Informations)

Events
 February – The first FELDA settlers arrived in Lurah Bilut, Pahang.
 6 February – Diocese of Singapore and Malaya was founded, renamed from Diocese of Singapore.
 10 February – Sultan Ismail was crowned as Sultan of Johor.
 4 April – Tuanku Abdul Rahman of Negeri Sembilan, the first Yang di-Pertuan Agong died. His body was brought back to Negeri Sembilan and laid to rest at Seri Menanti Royal Mausoleum, Seri Menanti.
 7 April – World Refugee Year was commemorated on a Malayan stamp.
 14 April – Sultan Hisamuddin Alam Shah of Selangor became the second Yang di-Pertuan Agong.
 27 May – First Malayan Hajj Pilgrimage to Mecca.
 31 May – Malayan Banking Berhad was incorporated.
 28 July – The Chinese Hibiscus became the Malayan national flower and renamed Bunga Raya.
 31 July – The second Yang di-Pertuan Agong, Sultan Hisamuddin Alam Shah of Selangor declared the state of emergency ended. A victory parade was held in Kuala Lumpur.
 1 August – The Internal Security Act 1960 was enacted. This act was repealed in 2012.
 25 August–11 September – Malaya competed at the 1960 Summer Olympics in Rome, Italy. Nine competitors, all men, took part in eleven events in four sports.
 1 September - The second Yang di-Pertuan Agong, Sultan Hisamuddin Alam Shah of Selangor died of a mysterious illness before his installation. His body was brought back to Selangor and laid to rest at royal mausoleum near Sultan Sulaiman Mosque, Klang.
 19 September – The Natural Rubber Research of Conference was held in Kuala Lumpur.
 21 September – Tuanku Syed Putra of Perlis was elected as the third Yang di-Pertuan Agong.
 5 October – The Congo Peacekeeping Mission (1960–1962): Malaya sent 1,947 personnel as part of the United Nations Operation in the Congo or ONUC. 
 25 October – The Kuala Lumpur British Royal Air Force base was officially handed over to the Malayan Royal Air Force.
 Unknown date – The Bible College of Malaysia was established as the Bible Institute of Malaya by the Assemblies of God of Malaysia.

Sports
 30 March–7 April – 1960 AFC Youth Championship

Births
 16 January – Wan Mohammad Khair-il Anuar Wan Ahmad – Politician
 18 January – Ismail Sabri Yaakob – Politician and 9th Prime Minister of Malaysia
 6 February – Abdul Razak Baginda – Former political analyst
 17 February – Misbun Sidek – Legendary badminton player
 22 March – Anthony Kevin Morais – Deputy public prosecutor (murder victim, died 2015)
 7 December – Rosli Rahman Adam – Actor and theater activist
 8 December – Lim Guan Eng – Politician, Former Finance Minister and 4th Chief Minister of Penang
 Unknown date – Khatijah Ibrahim – Singer
 Unknown date – Nasir Bilal Khan – Actor

Deaths
1 April – Tuanku Abdul Rahman – 1st Yang di-Pertuan Agong of Malaya
9 July – Sultan Ibrahim ibni Almarhum Sultan Muhammad IV – Sultan of Kelantan (1944-1960)
1 September – Sultan Hisamuddin Alam Shah – 2nd Yang di-Pertuan Agong of Malaya
13 December – Tun Tan Cheng Lock – Founder of MCA

See also 
 1960 
 1959 in Malaya | 1961 in Malaya
 History of Malaysia

 
Years of the 20th century in Malaysia
Malaya
1960s in Malaya
Malaya